This list contains cases of the European Commission of Human Rights, European Court of Human Rights (ECtHR), Inter-American Court of Human Rights, Inter-American Commission on Human Rights, Court of Justice of the European Union (CJEU), European Committee of Social Rights (ECSR) and United Nations Human Rights Committee (UN HRC) related to LGBT people. According to one study of the European human rights system, recognition of an LGBT right by the ECtHR increased the likelihood that other countries in the Council of Europe would adopt the LGBT right as policy.

Council of Europe

European Commission of Human Rights 
This table is for cases heard only by the European Commission of Human Rights, a human rights body of the Council of Europe disbanded in 1998. Cases heard by the commission and subsequently the European Court of Human Rights are listed in the next table. Both the commission and the court interpret the European Convention on Human Rights.

European Court of Human Rights 
A 2021 examination of the ECtHR's rulings on people seeking asylum on the grounds of their sexual orientation between 1990 and 2019 found that of 23 cases, 20 were declared inadmissible, 2 were denied, and one violation was found. This does not count cases that were struck out.

Concluded cases

ILGA-Europe maintains a list of recently concluded ECtHR cases and their execution status.

Pending cases

European Committee of Social Rights 
The European Committee of Social Rights issues judgements based on the European Social Charter, a Council of Europe treaty.

European Union 
All European Union member states are also members of the Council of Europe and subject to the ECtHR.

Court of Justice of the European Union
{| class="wikitable sortable"
! Date of ruling
! Case
! Topic

|-
| 1996
| C-13/94 P. v. S and Cornwall County Council
| Gender reassignment and its consequences
|-
| 1998
| C-249/96 Grant v. South West Trains Ltd.
| Housing tenure, social and employer's benefits
|-
| 2001
| C-125/99 D. v. Council
| Housing tenure, social and employer's benefits
|-
| 2004
| C-117/01 K.B. v. NHS Pensions Agency
| Gender reassignment and its consequences
|-
| 2006
| C-423/04 Richards v. Secretary of State for Work and Pensions
| Gender reassignment and its consequences
|-
| 2008
| C-267/06 Maruko v. VddB
| Housing tenure, social and employer's benefits
|-
| 2010 
| W. v. Commission
|-
| 2011
| C-147/08 Römer v. City of Hamburg
| Housing tenure, social and employer's benefits
|-
| 2012
| C-124/11 (Dittrich), C-125/11 (Klinke) and C143/11 (Müller) 
| Housing tenure, social and employer's benefits
|-
| 2013, April
| Asociatia Accept v Consiliul Naţional pentru Combaterea Discriminării (C-81/12)
| Employment
|-
| 2013, November
| Minister voor Immigratie en Asiel v X (C-199/12), Y (C-200/12),and Z v Minister voor Immigratie en Asiel (C-201/12)
| Residence permits, asylum and extradition
|-
| 2013, December
| Hay v Crédit agricole mutuel (C-267/12).
| Housing tenure, social and employer's benefits
|-
| 2014, December
| A, B, C v Staatssecretaris van Veiligheid en Justitie (C-148/13, C-149/13, C-150/13)
| Residence permits, asylum and extradition
|-
| 2015, April
| Léger v Ministre des Affaires sociales... (C-528/13)
| Blood donation
|-
| 2018, January
| F. v Bevándorlási és Állampolgársági Hivatal (C-473/16)
| Residence permits, asylum and extradition
|-
| 2018, June
| Coman and Others v Inspectoratul General pentru Imigrӑri and
Others (C-673/16)
| Residence permits, asylum and extradition
|-
| 2020, April
| NH v Associazione Avvocatura per i diritti LGBTI – Rete Lenford (C-507/18)
| Employment
|-
|2021, December
|V.M.A. v Stolichna Obsthina, Rayon 'Pancharevo''' (C-490/20) 
| Citizenship
|}

Organization of American States
 Inter-American Commission on Human Rights 

 Inter-American Court of Human Rights 

United Nations
 United Nations Human Rights Committee
The United Nations Human Rights Committee oversees the International Covenant on Civil and Political Rights.

See also

 LGBT rights in Europe
 Same-sex union court cases

References

Literature

Gabriel N. Toggenburg “LGBT” go Luxembourg: on the stance of Lesbian Gay Bisexual and Transgender Rights before the European Court of Justice'' European Law Reporter 5/2008
LGBTI Rights before the European Court of Human Rights: One Step at a Time FIDH 2014
Frédéric Edel Case Law of the European Court of Human Rights relating to discrimination on grounds of sexual orientation or gender identity Council of Europe, 2015

External links
European Court of Human Rights non-binding factsheets, issued by its Press Unit:
"Sexual Orientation Issues", May 2015
"Homosexuality: criminal aspects", June 2014
"Gender Identity Issues", March 2015
ECHR Sexual Orientation Blog by Prof. Paul Johnson (University of York)
Going to Strasbourg by Prof Paul Johnson, which contains oral history interviews with applicants to the European Court of Human Rights

European Court of Human Rights case law on LGBT rights
Court of Justice of the European Union case law
United Nations Human Rights Committee case law
International courts
Human rights-related lists